Ninjas vs. Zombies is a 2008 American independent film written and directed by Justin Timpane. It parodies the science-fiction, horror, zombie and ninja genres. The rough cut of the film premiered as a "bootleg screening" on October 31, 2008, and later screened on November 1, 2008 in Leesburg, Virginia at the historic Tally Ho Theatre.

Story
The film revolves around seven friends, three of whom are magically granted the use of ninja powers to fight back against hordes of zombies, and their evil leader Eric.  The press kit for the film describes the premise as follows:"Seven friends, struggling with late 20s, early 30s life, find themselves in terrifying danger when a long dead loved one is magically resurrected and starts devouring souls.  To make matters worse, three of them have been granted the power of the ninja, and now must lead the fight against a power they cannot hope to vanquish.  If they fail, the undead will overrun their little town, and maybe the world."

The closing credits thank "Joss Whedon (Who Doesn't Know We Exist)".

Soundtrack
The film features an eponymous theme song written and performed by Nick Bognar and Michael Roth. The song is also included on Bognar's 2009 album Our Mouths Are Open.

Critical reception

The production was anticipated within the horror film community, due in part to its combination of two popular genres—zombies and ninjas. In a comment typifying the appeal of the hybrid, BD Horror News noted, "There are ninjas, and there are zombies, what more do you need?"
In February 2009, the film garnered an "Award of Merit: Feature Film" at "The Indie Fest".
Another horror genre publication, "Fatally Yours," urged its readers to see the film, asking: "What? Do we need to send the zombie army to drag you there?" The same publication described the film as "a homegrown indy filmed right here in Northern VA. Part Evil Dead, part Clerks, part Buffy, part Bourne Identity, with some Harry Potter, a twist of vermouth and a lime chaser - uh, wait ... Funny, Violent, a Rollercoaster; with GOBS of local talent - and international appeal."
On the other hand, the film has been criticized for its thematic similarity to earlier works. One critic, for example, joked that it should not be confused with 1987's singular Ninja vs. Zombie, 1997's Zombie Ninja Gangbangers, or 2004's Vampires vs. Zombies, noting, "This is, er, zombieS versus ninjaS. You know, plural?"
Before its release, the film's third trailer received the following comments from movie reviewer Chris Beaumont.  "Seriously, how can you go wrong? It has zombies and ninjas, not to mention magic and blood. This super low-budget outing looks terrible. Terribly good that is. No, the production values are not good and the acting looks even worse, but what they lack in quality and polish, they more than appear to make up for with energy and love for the genre. Looking forward to this!"

Sequels
A sequel to the film, titled Ninjas vs Vampires was released in early 2011. A third film Ninjas vs Monsters released in 2013.

References

External links
 
 

2000s comedy horror films
2008 horror films
Ninja films
American zombie comedy films
American comedy horror films
2008 films
2008 comedy films
2000s English-language films
2000s American films